George Kay (c.1710–1766) was an 18th century Scottish minister of the Church of Scotland. He was Moderator of the General Assembly in 1760.

Life
He graduated MA at St Andrews University in 1729. He was licensed by the Presbytery of Kirkcaldy in 1734 and ordained as minister of Collessie Parish Church in 1739 and translated to Minto in 1741.

Making frequent steps he moved to Dysart in 1743 and St Cuthbert's Church, Edinburgh in 1747. From there he translated to New Greyfriars in 1752 and from there to "second charge" of Old Greyfriars in 1754, replacing Rev Robert Hamilton.

Edinburgh University awarded him an honorary Doctor of Divinity (DD) in 1759 and in May 1760 he was elected Moderator of the General Assembly. In 1760 he was also given the additional role of Army Chaplain serving Stirling Castle.

He died in Edinburgh on 10 April 1766 and is buried in Greyfriars Kirkyard. His role at Greyfriars was filled by Rev John Erskine.

Family

In 1747 he married Charlotte Sherriff, with whom he had two sons: David (b.1749), Charles (1751-1762) and a daughter, Margaret (b.1757). In 1761 he married Ann Forth who died in 1788.

References
 

1706 births
1766 deaths
Alumni of the University of St Andrews
Moderators of the General Assembly of the Church of Scotland
18th-century Ministers of the Church of Scotland